Melaleucia leucomera is a moth of the family Erebidae first described by George Hampson in 1926. It is known from south-central Sri Lanka.

There are probably multiple generations per year, with adults recorded in April, May, June, August and September.

The wingspan is 15–16 mm. The forewing is broad and white or beige white with a fine, narrow, partly interrupted subterminal line. There are terminal lines in some specimens, marked by black interveinal dots. The hindwing is greyish brown, with an indistinct discal spot.

References

Micronoctuini
Moths described in 1926